Tamás Takács may refer to:
 Tamás Takács (footballer, born 1979)
 Tamás Takács (footballer, born 1991)
 Tamás Takács (swimmer)